Road 67 is a road in southern Iran. It connects Yasuj to Shiraz then Jahrom, Lar and Hormozgan Province. The Shiraz-Yasuj part is crowded in summer and winter because in summer people go to Sepidan to use the cool weather in there and in winter to ski.

References

External links 

 Iran road map on Young Journalists Club

67
Transportation in Hormozgan Province